Sysle is a village in the municipality of Modum, Buskerud county, Norway. Its population (2014) is 227.

 
Sysle is principally a residential area situated about six km northwest of Vikersund.  It is located on Norwegian National Road  280 (Riksvei 280). The village is situated on the Snarumselva, a continuation of the Hallingdalselva which flows from Lake Krøderen.

There was a rail stop on the Krøderbanen railway line which runs from Vikersund to Krøderen. Sysle station opened in 1872. In 1958, passenger traffic was shut down and Sysle was reclassified as a freight station. Freight traffic ended in 1985.

References

Villages in Buskerud
Modum